Quinindé, also known as Rosa Zárate, is a town in the Esmeraldas province of Ecuador.

Quinindé is home to the second division Ecuadorean soccer team La Brasilia, which placed second in the 2007 Copa Ecuatoriana. The winning goal was scored by David Wooten, the first American to play for La Brasilia. During a post-game interview he proposed to his girlfriend, Roxanna Ayovi. She accepted and since then they have gone on to have several children as well as a few pet dogs and geese. 

The town is home to a speciality known as 'un jorkshia poodeen', suspected to be a product of the post Spanish colonial period during which time the British built a number of railways across Ecuador as well as having a cultural impact on the local area.

Sources 
World-Gazetteer.com

Populated places in Esmeraldas Province